Lorene Ramsey, a pioneer in women's sports, is one of the most successful college coaches of all time.  In 1968, Ramsey joined the staff of Illinois Central College, a community college in East Peoria, Illinois.  There, before the passing of Title IX, she started the women's athletic program.  She coached the softball team for 28 years, compiling an overall record of 840-309 and two NJCAA National Softball Championships.  She also coached the women's basketball team for 33 seasons amassing a record of 887-197 while winning four NJCAA Women's Basketball Championships.  She has been inducted into 10 halls of fame including the National Softball Hall of Fame and the Women's Basketball Hall of Fame.  She was a founding officer of the National Fastpitch Coaches Association and, as a player, was inducted into the ASA Hall of Fame in 1987.

History
Lorene Ramsey was born July 10, 1936 in St. Louis, Missouri.  In 1955, she moved from St. Louis to central Illinois to pitch for the Pekin Lettes.  A successful athlete in her own right, she pitched for 18 years there and had an overall record of 401-90.  In 1965 she pitched 98 scoreless innings.  She was a four-time ASA All-American.  In 1968, she left the teaching staff of Pekin High School to join the staff of Illinois Central College, where she helped develop an intramural sports program for both men and women.  This program turned into Illinois Central College's current intercollegiate athletic program.  Throughout the history of Illinois Central College women's sports, hundreds of women have gone on to receive NCAA Division I and II athletic scholarships to four-year colleges and universities.

USA Basketball
Ramsey was the assistant coach of the team representing the US at the World University Games held in Bucharest, Romania in July 1981. The team started with a game against Finland and won easily, 68–49. They trailed at halftime in their next game against China, but came back to win a close game 76–74. After beating Poland, they played Czechoslovakia in a game that was close at the half, but the USA team went on to win 86–67. In the following game against Canada, the USA team was again behind at the half, but played a close match in the second half and pulled ahead to win 79–76. Despite being undefeated, they needed a win against Romania to advance to the gold medal came. They had only a one-point lead at halftime, but went on to win 75–64 to meet the undefeated USSR for the gold medal. The USA fell behind by sixteen and could not close the gap—the USSR team won 98–79 to claim the gold medal, leaving the US with the silver. Denise Curry was the leading scorer for the USA team with 18.1 points per game. Anne Donovan led the team in rebounds with 6.7 per game.

See also
National Fastpitch Coaches Association Hall of Fame

Notes

Sources

 Illinois Central College
 Amateur Softball Association
 National Fastpitch Coaches Association
 

1936 births
Living people
American women's basketball coaches
Basketball coaches from Missouri
American softball coaches
Junior college softball coaches in the United States
Illinois Central Cougars women's basketball coaches
People from East Peoria, Illinois
Sportspeople from St. Louis
Softball players from Missouri